Edward Alured Draper (22 October 1776 in Oxfordshire, United Kingdom – 22 April 1841 in Rivière Noire, Mauritius) was a  military officer in the British Army and civil servant in Mauritius.

Draper was educated at Eton College. In 1793 he matriculated at Brasenose College, Oxford. In 1796, he became Lieutenant, then Captain in the British Army, and he served in West Indies and Egypt. In 1803, as a brevet major, he announced the capture of St. Lucia.  In defense of Sir Thomas Picton in 1804, he was jailed for three months for libel. However, a few years later he was again in the limelight as ADC to the prince Regent. He retired from the army as colonel

In 1812, he came to Mauritius. In the same year, he founded the Mauritius Turf Club and initiated the first horse races. For a short period he was appointed Chief Secretary in Bourbon Island. 

Back in Mauritius, Draper served in different capacities, namely as Chief of Police, Colonial Secretary, Collector of Customs, Civil engineer, Registrar of Slaves, Magistrate and Colonial Treasurer.
In 1818, he was suspended by General Cage Hall but once more his powerful friends in England came to his rescue and Draper was reinstated. In 1822 he married a Mauritian lady named Lucie de Krivelt. Draper supported the Mauritian planters against the British official in respect of slaves trade and the abolition of slavery issues.

Dismissed by Governor Nicolay in 1832, Draper was sent back to England. In 1836, he was back again in Mauritius, this time appointed Colonial Treasurer and Paymaster General. He died on 22 April 1841 and was buried at Riviere Noire.

Sources

Anniversaries and events, from the Mauritius philatelic bureau

Notes

1776 births
1841 deaths
British colonial governors and administrators in Africa
People educated at Eton College
Scots Guards officers
British Mauritius people
British Mauritius judges